Wolfgang Amadeus Phoenix is the fourth studio album by French indie pop band Phoenix. It was released on 25 May 2009 by V2 Records. While the band's previous work enjoyed a moderate underground following, the release of Wolfgang Amadeus Phoenix drew the attention of a more mainstream audience. In the US, Phoenix began a promotional tour including performances on several late night talk shows. Wolfgang Amadeus Phoenix continued to gain momentum with the increased exposure of the tour. The album received critical acclaim with many publications calling it one of the best albums of 2009.  Wolfgang Amadeus Phoenix earned the band a Grammy Award for Best Alternative Music Album at the 52nd Grammy Awards held on 31 January 2010.

Background
The album credits Phoenix band members Thomas Mars on vocals, Deck D'Arcy on bass, and Laurent Brancowitz and Christian Mazzalai on guitar. Phillipe Zdar produced and mixed the album and played drums on the song "Fences", with Cult of Luna drummer Thomas Hedlund playing drums on the majority of the album. Phoenix produced 10 songs for release on the album in the US and Canada under the Glassnote label.

The album name plays off of Wolfgang Amadeus Mozart, using his first and middle name and replacing his last with the band's name "Phoenix". Of the name, Phoenix, Thomas Mars says, "The album title is almost like a childish thing, like you're unleashing a child into the museum and he draws a mustache on the Mona Lisa or something ... It's kind of bratty, especially with me, my mom is German and Mozart is Austrian and in Germany it's like messing with the Pope or something."

Writing and composition
Wolfgang Amadeus Phoenix has been described as a pop rock, indie pop, synth-pop, and new wave album. Co-producer Philippe Zdar hosted the recording of the album from his in home studio in Paris. During the production of the album, the band recorded video of the sessions, which they have released as mini documentaries of their journey to create Wolfgang Amadeus Phoenix. The videos are available on the band's website.

Throughout the process, lead singer Thomas Mars, noted the use of Oblique Strategies flash cards to promote his creative thinking during the development of the album.

Reviewer Andrew Winistorfer said of the album, "'Wolfgang Amadeus Phoenix' opens with two monster singles, 'Lisztomania', a glittery anthem that manufactures a sense that you're in for greatness and an immense motion that gets more urgent as the song progresses, and '1901', a synth-washed heartfelt ode from frontman Thomas Mars about falling in love."

"Lisztomania" refers to the term 'Lisztomania', a word coined by the German romantic writer Heinrich Heine to describe the massive public response to Franz Liszt's virtuosic piano performances.

The third single, "Lasso", is one of the few songs in which the band has utilized a guitar solo. The opening drumbeat, fast-paced toms and the drumroll in the chorus were played on a synthesizer by Mars, who was a drummer at a young age.

Promotion and release

It was announced in early 2009 that the band would be releasing an album. The first single "1901" was released 23 February 2009.

In order to get fans interested in the album the band released an EP version of the album that was only available through iTunes. The EP featured both songs that were performed on SNL and two others; "Love Like a Sunset pt 1 & 2". On 25 May 2009 the album was released on V2 records in conjunction with Loyauté the band's own record label worldwide and on Glassnote in the United States of America.

From 12 May 2009, the album was available to download from the iTunes Store for customers in North America and from Amazon MP3.

On 7 August 2009, Phoenix performed a live version of "Lisztomania" on Australian youth radio network Triple J in a program called "Like a Version".

Reception

In Australia, the album debuted at number 13. It debuted on the US Billboard 200 albums chart at No. 37 and remained in the Top 100 for several weeks due to the alternative radio success of the album's singles "1901" and "Lisztomania". It has sold 721,000 copies in the US as of April 2013.

The album won the Grammy Award for Best Alternative Music Album on 31 January 2010.

Year-end list entries
5th – Times Top 10 Albums of 2009
3rd – Rolling Stone: The 25 Best Albums of 2009
8th – Pitchforks Top 50 Albums of 2009
1st – The A.V. Club: The top 25 albums of 2009
1st – ''Drowned in Sounds Top 50 Albums of 2009
2nd – Rhapsody: "The 25 Best Albums of 2009"
3rd – Spin's The 40 Best Albums of 2009
2nd – The Village Voices Pazz & Jop poll for 2009
"Lisztomania" and "1901" were both listed on Triple J's Hottest 100 for 2009, and received No. 4 and No. 13 respectively.

Track listingSpecial edition box set bonus remix CD'''

Personnel
 Thomas Mars – vocals
 Deck d'Arcy – bass, keyboards
 Laurent Brancowitz – guitar, keyboards
 Christian Mazzalai – guitar
 Thomas Hedlund – drums, drum samples, sampling

Charts

Weekly charts

Year-end charts

Certifications and sales

References

2009 albums
2009 remix albums
Grammy Award for Best Alternative Music Album
Phoenix (band) albums
V2 Records albums
V2 Records remix albums
Glassnote Records albums